José María Montes (March 22, 1920 – September 2, 2011) was an Argentine prelate of the Roman Catholic Church.

Montes was born in Almirante Brown, Argentina and was ordained a priest on December 20, 1958 from the Archdiocese of La Plata. He was appointed Auxiliary Archbishop of the Archdiocese of La Plata on June 15, 1978 as well as titular bishop of Lamdia, and was ordained bishop on August 15, 1978. Montes was appointed to the Diocese of Chascomús on January 19, 1983, where he served until his retirement on July 3, 1996.

References

External links
Catholic-Hierarchy

20th-century Roman Catholic bishops in Argentina
1920 births
2011 deaths
Roman Catholic bishops of Chascomús
Roman Catholic bishops of La Plata in Argentina